Leading University or LU is a private university of Bangladesh. It was established in 2001 under the Private University Act 1992. The campus of LU is located in Ragib Nagar, Kamal Bazar, South Surma, Sylhet.

Academics

Departments
Leading University has ten academic departments:
 Department of Architecture
 Department of Business Administration(BuA)
 Department of Civil Engineering (CE)
 Department of Computer Science & Engineering (CSE)
 Department of Electrical & Electronic Engineering (EEE)
 Department of English
 Department of Islamic Studies
 Department of Law
 Department of Public Health
 Department of Tourism and Hospitality Management (THM)
 Department of Bangla

Programs
The university offers the following undergraduate programs:
 Bachelor of Architecture
 B.A. (Hons) in Bangla
 BBA (Hons)
 B.Sc. in Civil Engineering
 B.Sc. (Hons) in Computer Science & Engineering
 B.Sc. (Hons) in Electrical & Electronics Engineering
 B.A. (Hons) in English
 B.A. (Hons) in Islamic Studies
 LL.B (Hons)
 Bachelor of Tourism & Hospitality Management

LU offers the following postgraduate programs:
 MBA (Regular)
 MBA (Executive)
 M.A. in English (Preliminary and Final)
 M.A. in Islamic Studies
 LL.M
 Master of Public Health
 M.Sc. in Computer Science and Engineering

List of vice-chancellors 
 Dr. Md. Qumruzzaman Chowdhury
 Qazi Azizul Mowla ( 2021-present )

References

 Private Universities in Bangladesh

Architecture schools in Bangladesh
Private universities in Bangladesh
Educational institutions established in 2001
Education in Sylhet
2001 establishments in Bangladesh
Universities and colleges in Bangladesh
Dakshin Surma Upazila